Yal Rud (also Romanized as Yāl Rūd, also known as Yālu) is a village in Sheykh Fazlolah-e Nuri Rural District, Baladeh District, Nur County, Mazandaran Province, Iran. At the 2006 census, its population was 153, in 47 families.

Ásíyih Khánum, the wife of Bahá'u'lláh, the founder of Baháʼí Faith was born in Yal Rud. She was the daughter of Mirza Esmaeil Yalroudi. The oldest family in village is Behzadi. They are the remnants of the Padusbani and Sassanied Empires.

References 

Populated places in Nur County